The Japan men's national artistic gymnastics team is a sport group governed by Japan Gymnastics Association and represents Japan in international gymnastics competitions and multi-sports events. Followed the establishment of All Japan Gymnastics Federation in 1930, the team first appeared at the 1932 Summer Olympics and gradually became the major force till this day. For nearly two decades, from 1960 to 1978, Japanese men was dominant and won every gold medal at the Olympics and World Championships.

History

1930-1958: Establishment to first medals 
The Japanese first appeared internationally at the 1932 Summer Olympics, following the establishment of All Japan Gymnastics Federation on April 13, 1930, and finished 5th. They returned 4 years later in Berlin, Germany and got 9th place. As the result of the World War II, Germany, Japan and Bulgaria, under Allied military occupations, were not allowed to send athletes to London.

The breakthrough came in 1952 when Japanese gymnasts achieved 4 medals at the 1952 Summer Olympics in Helsinki. Tadao Uesako brought home a silver in floor and a bronze in vault. Another two vault medalists were  Masao Takemoto and Takashi Ono, winning silver and bronze respectively. The team made its debut at the World Artistic Gymnastics Championships in 1954 and immediately achieved success, winning silver in Group All-around, their first world-level medal in the discipline. Takemoto became the champion in Floor, also the country first gold medal, and bronze in Parallel Bars.

Japan's performances in men's gymnastics improved incredibly at the 1956 Olympics, with 11 medals in total. While securing their position as 2nd best team in the world, winning silver in Group All-around, they also achieved first Olympic gold medal, with Takashi Ono being the champion in Horizontal Bar. Ono was also tied with Viktor Chukarin as the most decorated male gymnasts at the Games, winning silvers in All-around and Pommel Horse, and a bronze in Parallel Bars. Other successful Japanese gymnasts in individual disciplines were Masao Takemoto, winning 3 bronzes, Masumi Kubota, a silver in Parallel Bars and a bronze in Rings, and Nobuyuki Aihara, a bronze in Floor.

Ono and Takemoto led team Japan to defend their second place at the 1958 World Championships, with each of them winning 5 and 4 individual medals respectively. Takemoto successfully achieved another gold in Floor, and added a Vault silver and Horizontal Bar bronze to his collection. Ono received 3 silvers in All-around, Floor, Parallel Bars and a bronze in Vault. Another individual medal was a silver in Rings achieved by Nobuyuki Aihara.

1960-1978: World Superpower 
For nearly 30 years, Japan dominated men's gymnastics, winning every team competition from 1960 Summer Olympics to 1978 World Championships. During this golden age, many gymnasts rose to prominent and achieved overwhelming success. Despite the World Championships only be held every four year, multiple legends appeared and became some of the most decorated gymnasts in the history. Notable names could be mentioned are Sawao Kato, who's holding the record of most Olympics gold medals, Akinori Nakayama, most Olympic and World victories until being surpassed by Kohei Uchimura in 2016, Eizo Kenmotsu, 24 medals including 10 gold, Mitsuo Tsukahara, 15 medals with 9 gold, Yukio Endo, 8 victories and 17 times being on the podium, Takashi Ono, whose glory continued until 1964 Summer Olympics, Shigeru Kasamatsu, Haruhiro Yamashita, Shuji Tsurumi, Nobuyuki Aihara, Takashi Mitsukuri,...

 1960 Summer Olympics

Japan defeated the USSR in Team All-around for the first time, ending a decade of Soviet domination in the discipline. Takashi Ono brough home two more gold medals in Vault and horizontal bar, as well as an all around silver, and two bronzes in rings and parallel bars, respectively. Nobuyuki Aihara also won the floor, and other 2 medals were achieved by Masao Takemoto, with a silver in horizontal bar, and Shuji Tsurumi, the pommel horse bronze medalist. In total, Japanese team won 9 medals, 2 less than 4 years ago, but 3 more gold, jumping to second place with only 2 behind the USSR.

 1962 World Championships

At the World Championships 2 years later in Prague, Japan surpassed the USSR, climbing to the first on men's medal table. They continued the victory in team, while also being successful in individual events, winning another 3 gold, 4 silver and 3 bronze. Yukio Endo was the biggest star by reaching the podium in every category except for pommel horse. He shared the victory in floor with the reigning Olympic Champion and compatriot Nobuyuki Aihara, getting silvers in individual all-around, rings and horizonal bar, bronzes in vault and parallel bars. Takashi Ono adding another gold in horizontal bar to his collection. Another 2 medal of the Japanese team were a silver from the later Olympic and world vault champion, Haruhiro Yamashita and a bronze in pommel horse by Takashi Mitsukuri.

 1964 Summer Olympics

When Japan hosted their first Olympics in 1964, their male gymnasts won big at home. The Japanese men achieved the total of 5 gold medals, more than the whole Soviet team, male and female, combined. The defending Olympic and world champion successfully secured the top position in team, with the exact score different like 4 years ago, 2.500. Yukio Endo won the first gold medal in all-around for Japan, while his compatriot Shuji Tsurumi got the silver. The two men also achieved 2 other medals each, with Endo winning gold parallel bars and silver in floor, and Tsurumi getting 2 silvers in parallel bars & pommel horse. in vault, the defending world runner-up Haruhiro Yamashita became the Olympic champion, and Takuji Hayata bought Japan the first victory in rings.

 1966 World Championships

Japan showed their domination rival at the 1966 World Championships by winning 13 medals, including 4 golds, 5 silvers and 4 bronzes. Akinori Nakayama was the biggest star with 3 championship titles in team, floor, parallel bars, as well as a silver in rings and 2 bronzes in all-around and vault. In total, he won the same number of medals as the Soviet men, also the number of gold medals. The defending Olympic champion in vault, Haruhiro Yamashita successfully became the world champion in the same apparatus. All other 4 Japanese gymnasts were also be on the podium in individual events. Yukio Endo won 2 silvers in floor and horizontal bar. Takeshi Kato got a silver in vault and a bronze in pommel horse. Takashi Mitsukuri helped Japan achieve the podium sweep in horizontal bar. Shuji Tsurumi, the all-around runner-up, also qualified for all 6 apparatus finals. However, an injury happened in rings performance caused him to withdraw from the competition.

 1968 Summer Olympics

 1970 World Championships

 1972 Summer Olympics

 1974 World Championships

 1976 Summer Olympics

 1978 World Championships

1979-1992: Declining Results 
 1979 World Championships

 1981 World Championships

 1983 World Championships

 1984 Summer Olympics

 1985 World Championships

 1987 World Championships

 1988 Summer Olympics

 1989 World Championships

 1991 World Championships

 1992 World Championships

 1992 Summer Olympics

1993-2002: Deeply Struggling 

 1993 World Championships

 1994 World Championships

 1995 World Championships

 1996 World Championships

 1996 Summer Olympics

 1997 World Championships

 1999 World Championships

 2000 Summer Olympics

 2001 World Championships

 2002 World Championships

2003-2008: Returning to Top & Olympic Gold 

 2003 World Championships

 2004 Summer Olympics

 2005 World Championships

 2006 World Championships

 2007 World Championships

 2008 Summer Olympics

2009-2016: Uchimura's Era 

 2009 World Championships

 2010 World Championships

 2011 World Championships

 2012 Summer Olympics

 2013 World Championships

 2014 World Championships

 2015 World Championships

 2016 Summer Olympics

2017-2020: Post Uchimura & Declining Results 

 2017 World Championships

 2018 World Championships

 2019 World Championships

2021- : Hashimoto & World Leading Teams 

 2020 Summer Olympics

 2021 World Championships

 2022 World Championships

Recent Squads

2021 - 2024

2017 - 2020

Team Competition Results

Olympic Games 
 1896 through 1928 — did not participate
 1932 — 5th place
Toshihiko Sasano, Shigeo Homma, Takashi Kondo, Yoshitaka Takeda, Fujio Kakuta
 1936 — 9th place
Yoshitaka Takeda, Hikoroku Arimoto, Yoshio Miyake, Hiroshi Nosaka, Kiichiro Toyama, Dokan Sone, Fujio Kakuta, Hiroshi Matsunobu
 1948 — banned from participating
 1952 — 5th place
Akitomo Kaneko, Tetsumi Nabeya, Takashi Ono, Masao Takemoto, Tadao Uesako
 1956 —  silver medal
Nobuyuki Aihara, Akira Kono, Masami Kubota, Takashi Ono, Masao Takemoto, Shinsaku Tsukawaki
 1960 —  gold medal
Nobuyuki Aihara, Yukio Endo, Takashi Mitsukuri, Takashi Ono, Masao Takemoto, Shuji Tsurumi
 1964 —  gold medal
Yukio Endo, Takuji Hayata, Takashi Mitsukuri, Takashi Ono, Shuji Tsurumi, Haruhiro Yamashita
 1968 —  gold medal
Yukio Endo, Sawao Kato, Takeshi Kato, Eizo Kenmotsu, Akinori Nakayama, Mitsuo Tsukahara
 1972 —  gold medal
Shigeru Kasamatsu, Sawao Kato, Eizo Kenmotsu, Akinori Nakayama, Teruichi Okamura, Mitsuo Tsukahara
 1976 —  gold medal
Shun Fujimoto, Hisato Igarashi, Hiroshi Kajiyama, Sawao Kato, Eizo Kenmotsu, Mitsuo Tsukahara
 1980 — did not participate
 1984 —  bronze medal
Koji Gushiken, Noritoshi Hirata, Nobuyuki Kajitani, Shinji Morisue, Koji Sotomura, Kyoji Yamawaki
 1988 —  bronze medal
Yukio Iketani, Hiroyuki Konishi, Koichi Mizushima, Daisuke Nishikawa, Toshiharu Sato, Takahiro Yameda
 1992 —  bronze medal
Yutaka Aihara, Takashi Chinen, Yoshiaki Hatakeda, Yukio Iketani, Masayuki Matsunaga, Daisuke Nishikawa
 1996 — 10th place
Naoya Tsukahara, Hikaru Tanaka, Yoshiaki Hatakeda, Toshiharu Sato, Shigeru Kurihara, Takashi Uchiyama
 2000 — 4th place
Naoya Tsukahara, Yoshihiro Saito, Kenichi Fujita, Mutsumi Harada, Akihiro Kasamatsu, Norimasa Iwai
 2004 —  gold medal
Takehiro Kashima, Hisashi Mizutori, Daisuke Nakano, Hiroyuki Tomita, Naoya Tsukahara, Isao Yoneda
 2008 —  silver medal
Hiroyuki Tomita, Takehiro Kashima, Koki Sakamoto, Makoto Okiguchi, Kohei Uchimura, Takuya Nakase
 2012 —  silver medal
Ryohei Kato, Kazuhito Tanaka, Yusuke Tanaka, Kohei Uchimura, Koji Yamamuro
 2016 —  gold medal
Ryohei Kato, Kenzo Shirai, Yusuke Tanaka, Kohei Uchimura, Koji Yamamuro
 2020 —  silver medal
Daiki Hashimoto, Kazuma Kaya, Takeru Kitazono, Wataru Tanigawa

World Championships 
 1954 —  silver medal
Akitomo Kaneko, Akira Kono, Masami Kubota, Tetsumi Nabeya, Takashi Ono, Yoshiyuki Oshima, Masao Takemoto
 1958 —  silver medal
Nobuyuki Aihara, Akira Kono, Takashi Ono, Masao Takemoto, Katsumi Terai, Shinsaku Tsukawaki
 1962 —  gold medal
Nobuyuki Aihara, Yukio Endo, Takashi Mitsukuri, Takashi Ono, Shuji Tsurumi, Haruhiro Yamashita
 1966 —  gold medal
Shuji Tsurumi, Akinori Nakayama, Takeshi Katō, Yukio Endo, Takashi Mitsukuri, Haruhiro Matsuda
 1970 —  gold medal
Eizo Kenmotsu, Mitsuo Tsukahara, Akinori Nakayama, Fumio Honma, Takuji Hayata, Takeshi Katō
 1974 —  gold medal
Shigeru Kasamatsu, Eizo Kenmotsu, Mitsuo Tsukahara, Hiroshi Kajiyama, Fumio Honma, Sawao Kato
 1978 —  gold medal
Hiroshi Kajiyama, Shigeru Kasamatsu, Eizo Kenmotsu, Junichi Shimizu, Shinzo Shiraishi, Mitsuo Tsukahara
 1979 —  silver medal
Hiroshi Kajiyama, Shigeru Kasamatsu, Nobuyuki Kajitani, Toshiomi Nishikii, Koji Gushiken, Eizo Kenmotsu
 1981 —  silver medal
Nobuyuki Kajitani, Koji Gushiken, Koji Sotomura, Kiyoshi Goto, Kyoji Yamawaki, Toshiro Kanai
 1983 —  bronze medal
Koji Gushiken, Koji Sotomura, Nobuyuki Kajitani, Mitsuaki Watanabe, Noritoshi Hirata, Shinji Morisue
 1985 — 4th place
Koji Gushiken, Koji Sotomura, Hiroyuki Konishi, Kyoji Yamawaki, Mitsuaki Watanabe, Shigemitsu Kondo
 1987 — 5th place
Koichi Mizushima, Naoyuki Terao, Hiroyuki Konishi, Morimasa Honda, Yukihiro Hayase, Shinji Kanda
 1989 — 4th place
Toshiharu Sato, Yukio Iketani, Yoshikazu Nakamura, Daisuke Nishikawa, Hiroyuki Kato, Masayuki Matsunaga
 1991 — 4th place
Yukio Iketani, Yoshiaki Hatakeda, Daisuke Nishikawa, Takashi Chinen, Masayuki Matsunaga, Yutaka Aihara
 1994 — 5th place
Hikaru Tanaka, Daisuke Nishikawa, Masayuki Matsunaga, Toshiharu Sato, Takehiko Ono, Yoshiaki Hatakeda, Masayoshi Maeda
 1995 —  silver medal
Yoshiaki Hatakeda, Daisuke Nishikawa, Hikaru Tanaka, Toshiharu Sato, Masayuki Matsunaga, Hiromasa Masuda, Masayoshi Maeda
 1997 — 4th place
Kenichi Fujita, Yoshiaki Hatakeda, Takuya Kishimoto, Shigeru Kurihara, Naoya Tsukahara, Yoshihiro Saito
 1999 — 4th place
Naoya Tsukahara, Yoshihiro Saito, Akihiro Kasamatsu, Kenichi Fujita, Mutsumi Harada, Tatsuya Yamada
 2001 — did not participate
 2003 —  bronze medal
Takehiro Kashima, Hiroyuki Tomita, Naoya Tsukahara, Tatsuya Yamada
 2006 —  bronze medal
Hisashi Mizutori, Takehito Mori, Takuya Nakase, Eichi Sekiguchi, Hiroyuki Tomita, Naoya Tsukahara
 2007 —  silver medal
Hisashi Mizutori, Hiroyuki Tomita, Yosuke Hoshi, Makoto Okiguchi, Takuya Nakase, Shun Kuwahara
 2010 —  silver medal
Kōhei Uchimura, Koji Yamamuro, Koji Uematsu, Kazuhito Tanaka, Kenya Kobayashi, Tatsuki Nakashima
 2011 —  silver medal
Kōhei Uchimura, Kazuhito Tanaka, Kenya Kobayashi, Koji Yamamuro, Makoto Okiguchi, Yusuke Tanaka
 2014 —  silver medal
Kohei Kameyama, Ryohei Kato, Shogo Nonomura, Kenzo Shirai, Yusuke Tanaka, Kōhei Uchimura, Kazuyuki Takeda*
 2015 —  gold medal
Naoto Hayasaka, Ryohei Kato, Kazuma Kaya, Kenzō Shirai, Yusuke Tanaka, Kōhei Uchimura, Tomomasa Hasegawa*
 2018 —  bronze medal
Kazuma Kaya, Kenzō Shirai, Yūsuke Tanaka, Wataru Tanigawa, Kōhei Uchimura, Kakeru Tanigawa*
 2019 —  bronze medal
Daiki Hashimoto, Yuya Kamoto, Kazuma Kaya, Kakeru Tanigawa, Wataru Tanigawa, Shogo Nonomura*
 2022 —  silver medal
Ryosuke Doi, Daiki Hashimoto, Yuya Kamoto, Kakeru Tanigawa, Wataru Tanigawa, Kazuma Kaya''*

Asian Games 
 1974 —  silver medal
Kazuo Horide, Kenji Igarashi, Takeo Igarashi, Ryuji Nakayama, Hideyuki Nozawa, Hiroshi Sugawara
 1978 —  silver medal
Nobuyuki Kajitani, Junichi Kitagawa, Toshiomi Nishikii, Teruichi Okamura, Shinzo Shiraishi, Haruyasu Taguchi
 1982 —  silver medal
Koji Gushiken, Noritoshi Hirata, Nobuyuki Kajitani, Shinji Morisue, Taichi Okada, Koji Sotomura
 1986 —  bronze medal
Yukihiro Hayase, Hiroyuki Konishi, Koichi Mizushima, Hiroaki Okabe, Koji Sotomura, Kyoji Yamawaki
 1990 —  silver medal
Yutaka Aihara, Yoshiaki Hatakeda, Yukio Iketani, Masayuki Matsunaga, Daisuke Nishikawa, Toshiharu Sato
 1994 —  bronze medal
Takashi Chinen, Yoshiaki Hatakeda, Horimasa Masuda, Masayuki Matsunaga, Daisuke Nishikawa, Toshiharu Sato, Hikaru Tanaka
 1998 —  bronze medal
Mutsumi Harada, Akihiro Kasamatsu, Yasuhiro Ogawa, Yoshihiro Saito, Naoya Tsukahara, Isao Yoneda
 2002 —  bronze medal
Mutsumi Harada, Takehiro Kashima, Hisashi Mizutori, Yasuhiro Ogawa, Hiroyuki Tomita, Naoya Tsukahara
 2006 —  silver medal
Ryosuke Baba, Kenya Kobayashi, Shun Kuwahara, Hisashi Mizutori, Hiroyuki Tomita, Yuki Yoshimura
 2010 —  silver medal
Ryosuke Baba, Ryotaka Deguchi, Shun Kuwahara, Hisashi Mizutori, Takuya Nakase, Kyoichi Watanabe
 2014 —  gold medal
Tomomasa Hasegawa, Yuya Kamoto, Yusuke Saito, Shotaro Shirai, Kazuyuki Takeda, Masayoshi Yamamoto
 2018 —  silver medal
Kenta Chiba, Tomomasa Hasegawa, Fuya Maeno, Shogo Nonomura, Kakeru Tanigawa

Asian Championships 
 1996 —  bronze medal
 2003 —  silver medal
Yoshihiro Saito, Akihiro Kasamatsu, Masaki Endo, Yasuhiro Ogawa
 2006 —  silver medal
Tomoharu Sano, Hiroaki Kusu, Kazusa Fujita, Ryuta Nakazato
 2008 —  gold medal
Naoyuki Terao, Koji Yamamuro, Yosuke Hoshi, Shoichi Yamamoto, Ryosuke Baba, Go Tagashira
 2012 —  silver medal
Minori Koyama, Yoshiaki Furutani, Takayuki Ohara, Yu Suzuki, Rikii Hoshino, Kenzo Shirai
 2015 —  gold medal
Naoto Hayasaka, Yusuke Tanaka, Ryohei Kato, Kazuma Kaya, Koji Yamamuro, Kenzo Shirai
 2017 —  bronze medal
Hayato Uchida, Jun Muraoka, Shuto Horiuchi, Tatsuki Ichise, Hiroki Ishikawa
 2019 —  silver medal
Daisuke Fudono, Hibiki Arayashiki, Minori Haruki, Tatsuki Tanaka, Jumpei Oka
 2022 —  silver medal
Tsuyoshi Hasegawa, Daiki Hidaka, Kouki Maeda, Shiga Tachibana, Kenya Yuasa

Summer Universiade 
 1963 —  gold medal
 1965 —  gold medal
 1967 —  gold medal
 1970 —  gold medal
 1973 —  silver medal
 1977 —  silver medal
 1979 —  silver medal
 1981 — 
 1983 — 
 1985 —  silver medal
 1987 —  bronze medal
 1991 —  silver medal
 1993 — 
 1995 —  gold medal
 1997 —  silver medal
 1999 —  gold medal
 2001 —  silver medal
 2003 —  bronze medal
Masaki Endo, Akifumi Sasaki, Naoya Tabara, Yuki Yoshimura
 2005 —  gold medal
Ryosuke Baba, Takehiro Kashima, Shun Kuwahara, Takehito Mori, Hiroyuki Tomita
 2007 —  gold medal
Hisashi Mizutori, Koki Sakamoto, Kohei Uchimura, Kazuya Ueda, 
 2009 —  gold medal
Yosuke Hoshi, Takuya Nakase, Takuya Niijima, Makoto Okiguchi, Kyoichi Watanabe
 2011 —  gold medal
Yodai Hojo, Hiroki Ishikawa, Ryuzo Sejima, Masayoshi Yamamoto, Shoichi Yamamoto
 2013 —  bronze medal
Hiroki Ishikawa, Ryohei Kato, Shogo Nonomura, Yusuke Tanaka, Chihiro Yoshioka
 2015 —  gold medal
Naoto Hayasaka, Kaito Imabayashi, Yuya Kamoto, Shogo Nonomura, Chihiro Yoshioka
 2017 —  gold medal
Kenta Chiba, Tomomasa Hasegawa, Yuya Kamoto, Shogo Nonomura, Wataru Tanigawa
 2019 —  gold medal
Kazuma Kaya, Kakeru Tanigawa, Wataru Tanigawa

Most Decorated Gymnasts

Multiple Medalists

Multiple Gold Medalists

Multiple Individual Medalists

Multiple Individual Gold Medalists

See also 
 Japan women's national gymnastics team

References 

Gymnastics in Japan
National men's artistic gymnastics teams
Gymnastics